Sericomyia chrysotoxoides , (Macquart 1842), the Oblique-banded Pond Fly , is a common species of syrphid fly observed across the eastern half of North America and in the Rocky Mountains. Syrphid flies are also known as Hover Flies or Flower Flies because the adults are frequently found hovering around flowers from which they feed on nectar and pollen. The larvae of this genus are known as rat tailed maggots for the long posterior breathing tube.

References

Bugguide.net. Species Sericomyia chrysotoxoides

Diptera of North America
Eristalinae
Insects described in 1842
Taxa named by Pierre-Justin-Marie Macquart
Hoverflies of North America